Dai Nippon Butoku Kai (DNBK) was a martial arts organization with strong ties to WWII-era Japanese government, originally established in 1895 in Kyoto. Following the end of World War II, the DNBK changed its status from a public to a private organization.  Enrollment fell significantly from millions to hundreds and it lost its authority to  govern all martial arts organizations in Japan. In 1946, due to its association with the Japanese Military during wartime, the GHQ dissolved the DNBK.  The following years, more than 1,300 leaders and officials of the DNBK were purged—ostracized, lost their jobs, and were forbidden to take any government position. In 1953, a new organization with the same name was established with a new philosophical vision of preserving the long-standing illustrious classical martial virtues and traditions.

History

The Establishment of the Original Military School
The original Dai Nippon Butoku Kai facility was created as a private organization in 1895 in Kyoto.  
By the 1930s a systematic appropriation of martial arts by the state was underway, fueled in the successful wake of the Russo-Japanese War, sped up even more in 1942-1945 during the apex of Japan's "militarisation"(sengika.) This led to a number of "unprecedented policies aimed at making martial arts education combat effective and ideologically aligned with ultra-nationalistic government policy"  were set into motion. This strove to corral any and all budo organizations under state control to which the proposal of the "National Physical Strength Deliberation Council" sponsored by the Ministry of Health and Welfare recommended that an "all-encompassing extra-governmental organization" formed between the five ministries of Kōseishō (Health and Welfare), Mombushō (Education), Rikugunshō (Army), Kaigunshō (Navy) and the Naimushō (Home) which promoted budō in schools, community organizations and groups. This was an effective way to expand the reach and breadth of the harmful propaganda being issued by the ultra nationalistic government into the community, plus allowing a clear path to community indoctrination through budō programs; especially notable was the efforts targeting children and schools that is apparent by the amount of funding it received, allocated by a national budget at the time.

The response was as follows: 
"We have reached a consensus to restructure the Dai-Nippon Butokukai, a registered society that has contributed to the advancement of budō for many years, and incorporate it into the organs of government."
 This allowed public funding to be spent on a larger project nationally.

After the end of World War II, the Supreme Commander of Allied Powers (General Douglas MacArthur) issued a directive to dissolve any and all military-related or nationalistic propaganda organizations. The disbanding was done under the "Removal and Exclusion of Undesirable Personnel from Public Office," which issued a purge directive contained in SCAPIN9 548 (Removal of Ultranationalists) clearly stating:
"ultra-nationalistic or militaristic social, political, professional and commercial societies and institutions will be dissolved and prohibited."

This was accompanied by SCAPIN 550 (Removal and Exclusion of Undesirable Personnel from Public Office) which states:
"Persons who have been active exponents of militarism and militant nationalism will be removed and excluded from public office and from any positions of public or substantial private responsibility."

In a memorandum proposed to the Chief of Staff, it also stated:
"Dissolution of Dai Nippon Butokukai by order to the Imperial Japanese Government is recommended in accordance with the provisions of SCAPIN 548 Paragraph I-f on the grounds that this is an organization 'affording military or quasi-military training' and which provides for the 'perpetuation of militarism' or a martial spirit in Japan."

The Reestablishment of DNBK
In 1953, a new organization with the name Dai Nippon Butoku Kai was established to revive the pre-WWII DNBK with the philosophical vision of preserving the long-standing illustrious classical martial virtues and traditions. This new DNBK aims for the restoration of classical martial cultures, supporting allied research, instruction and service, promotion of international peace and harmony, and the advancement of greater humanity through Budo education.

Though this organization applied to be recognized as an official organization with the Japanese government in 1953, granting of this status was rejected until 2012, as it was opposed by multiple organizations (such as the All Japan Kendo Federation, and the All Japan Judo Federation) which had inherited the original DNBK's duties and operations. While it is recognized by the government as an official brand new organization, similar to other organizations, it is no longer directly tied with any government office such as the ministry of sports or ministry of education, and therefore does not have the same access to the official training halls (Butokuden) like the original, and its current membership is in the few thousands. 

The first official branch outside Japan was established in Virginia (USA) and in 1985 a division in the east coast USA.

In 1974, DNBK officially established the International Division overseeing all international members. In 2011, DNBK has official representatives and coordinators in Canada, United Kingdom, Italy, Belgium, Portugal, Israel, Hungary, Russia, Germany, Spain, Malta, France and California USA, Hawaii USA, Mid-Western USA, Boston USA, Arizona USA, Florida USA, Australia, Romania, Switzerland, Armenia, Chile, Switzerland, Greece, Gibraltar, Austria, and Nepal.

References 

Empire of Japan
Japanese culture
Martial arts organizations
Japanese swordsmanship
Kendo
Sports organizations established in 1895
1895 establishments in Japan
Organizations disestablished in 1946
Kendo organizations